Leave the Light On is the second album by American country music artist Jeff Bates. Released on April 11, 2006 (see 2006 in country music), it includes the singles "Long, Slow Kisses" (a re-recording of a song originally found on his debut album Rainbow Man), "Good People", "No Shame" and "One Second Chance". Respectively, these reached numbers 17, 42, 45, and 59 on the Billboard country charts. Also covered here is Billy "Crash" Craddock's 1974 single "Rub It In".

Track listing
"Long, Slow Kisses" (Jeff Bates, Gordon Bradberry, Ben Hayslip) – 3:10
"Rub It In" (Layng Martine, Jr.) – 3:05
"No Shame" (Bates, Kenny Beard, Jimmy Yeary) – 3:02
"Hands On Man" (Carson Chamberlain, Mark D. Sanders, Michael White) – 2:50
"Leave the Light On" (Beard, Yeary, Monty Criswell) – 3:28
"That'll Get You Ten" (Wade Kirby, Eric Church) – 3:59
"The Woman He Walked On" (Bob DiPiero, Mitzi Dawn Jenkins, Tony Mullins) – 3:05
"One Second Chance" (Arlis Albritton, Chris DuBois, Dave Turnbull) – 3:44
"Good People" (Tim James, Kendell Marvel) – 3:05
"I Can't Write That" (Bates, Beard, Billy Yates) – 3:55
"What I Know" (Beard, Casey Beathard) – 3:05
"Mama Was a Lot Like Jesus" (Rob Crosby, Kelly Shiver, Ray Stephenson) – 3:30

Personnel
Jeff Bates- acoustic guitar, electric guitar, lead vocals
Kenny Beard- background vocals
Joe Chemay- bass guitar
Perry Coleman- background vocals
Chad Cromwell- drums
Eric Darken- percussion
Chip Davis- background vocals
Dan Dugmore- pedal steel guitar
David Grissom- electric guitar
Tony Harrell- keyboards
Wes Hightower- background vocals
Mike Johnson- pedal steel guitar
Kyle Lehning- keyboards
Liana Manis- background vocals
Brent Mason- electric guitar
Scott Neubert- acoustic guitar
Billy Panda- acoustic guitar
Joe Spivey- fiddle
Cindy Richardson-Walker- background vocals
Dennis Wilson- background vocals
Casey Wood- percussion

Chart performance

External links
[ Leave the Light On] at Allmusic

2006 albums
Jeff Bates albums
RCA Records albums
Albums produced by Blake Chancey